Taddeo Carlone (died 25 March 1613) was a Swiss-Italian sculptor and architect.

His father, Giovanni, was a sculptor from Como. A native of Rovio, in Ticino, he moved with his father to Genoa. Taddeo's brother Giuseppe was a sculptor with his brother, and later in Lombardy. Taddeo married Geronima Verra in Genoa. He became the head of an important family of artists, including his sons Giovanni Battista and Giovanni, who were noted painters. Bernardo and Tommaso, sons of Giuseppe, were sculptors and architects in Genoa and Piedmont.

He died in 1613 and was buried in Genoa at the church (no longer extant) of San Francesco in Castelletto.

Works
His works include
Marble statue of San Antonio Abato in the oratory of Santa Caterina d’Alessandria in Alassio
Tombs for members of the Doria family in the church of Santa Maria della Cella in Sampierdarena, now part of Genoa
Statue of Santo Stefano originally at the Porta dell’Arco of the church of Santo Stefano in Genoa, now relocated to via Banderali
Portrait of Andrea Doria, now in the Palazzo Ducale in Genoa
Façade of the Sanctuary of Nostra Signora della Misericordia in Savona

References

Sources

16th-century births
1613 deaths
Architects from Ticino
16th-century Italian architects
17th-century Italian architects
16th-century Italian sculptors
Italian male sculptors
17th-century Italian sculptors